Replication protein A 30 kDa subunit is a protein that in humans is encoded by the RPA4 gene.

References

Further reading